Víctor Gustavo Velázquez Ramos (born 17 April 1991) is a Paraguayan footballer who plays as a centre-back for Argentine club Newell's Old Boys, on loan from FC Juárez.

References

External links
 
 Víctor Velázquez at Soccerstand
 
 

1991 births
Living people
Paraguayan footballers
Paraguayan expatriate footballers
Association football defenders
Cerro Porteño players
Sportivo Luqueño players
Club Nacional footballers
Club Sol de América footballers
Lobos BUAP footballers
FC Juárez footballers
Paraguayan Primera División players
Liga MX players
Argentine Primera División players
Paraguayan expatriate sportspeople in Mexico
Paraguayan expatriate sportspeople in Argentina
Expatriate footballers in Mexico
Expatriate footballers in Argentina